Auseklis is a Latvian god, a stellar deity that represents a celestial body, but possibly not the same as Venus (Rīta zvaigzne) - the first "star" (how Latvians call it) to appear in the mornings on the east side of the sky. He is the third most popular deity in Latvian mythology after Saulė and Mēness, but is almost exclusively mentioned in folk songs.

Name 
The name Auseklis stems from the root aus- ('dawn'), attached to the derivative suffix -eklis, and is etymologically related to other Indo-European deities of the dawn.

This deity is also variously known as Auseklenis, Auseklenč, Ausekleņš, Auseklīts, Auseklītis, Ausekliņis, Ausekliņš, Auseklius.

Role 
Auseklis is closely associated with Mēness ("moon"). They both are Dieva dēli ("sons of God"), as is Ūsiņš, and are thus confused with each other and with other male deities. Auseklis is referred to as male in the context of the dainas (folksong), and is seen as the groom of Saules meita ("daughter of the sun"), who came all the way to Germany to court her.

He is also said to be the attendant to a Sun deity and helper in the activities of the "heavenly bath house".

According to scholar Elza Kokare, Auseklis belongs to a group of heavenly deities that take part in a mythological drama about a "celestial wedding". Auseklis is seen as a groom of Saules meita, a daughter of Saule, the female Baltic sun - the others being moon god Meness and twin gods Dieva deli. Auseklis, in other accounts, is a guest or member of the bridal cortege at the wedding of Saules meita with another character, or he is deprived of his bride because of Meness's quarreling.

Auseklis is often referred to as being very young. As a reflex of this, he is seen as too young to work with the other deities, is very playful, and his horse is either bought by him or for him by the Sun.

According to Marija Gimbutas's analysis, Auseklis is a "dievaitis" ('little god') that appears with a horse the Sun gave him, and falls in love with the daughter of the (female) Sun ("Saules dukterims").

According to Lithuanian folklorist and ethnologist Nijolė Laurinkienė (lt), Harald Biezais was of the opinion that Auseklis was a male god and a son of Dievs ("Dievo sunus"). He was also part of the "celestial marriage" drama, being the first betrothed of the Sun's Daughter (Saules meita).

Symbol 

Auseklis is also the name of the eight-pointed star (an isogonal octagram). It is also known as one of the crosses of Lietuvēns (a malevolent spirit). The other cross of Lietuvēns is the pentagram, which symbolizes Venus in other cultures, suggesting that both signs might have originally been symbols of Auseklis. In more modern times, the pentagram is sometimes seen as a symbol of evil, however, originally both signs were used for protection from evil and are named after Lietuvēns because they were used to ward it off. Both signs had to be drawn without lifting the hand to ensure that protection was effective.

In the 1980s, the octagram became the symbol of the third Latvian National Awakening.

See also 
 Aušrinė
 Triquetra

References

Bibliography

Further reading 
Latvijas Enciklopēdija, Rīga 2002, 
Dainuskapis.lv
 Calin, Didier. Indo-European Poetics and the Latvian Folk Songs. Riga: 1996. Thesis (expanded version).

External links
 Latvian dainas about the celestial deities

Latvian gods
Stellar gods
Venusian deities
Religious symbols
Baltic gods